The 4th Foot Guards were an infantry regiment of the Royal Prussian Army. The regiment was formed in 1860. It served with the Guards Corps in the Second Schleswig War, the Austro-Prussian war, the Franco-Prussian war, and World War I. The regiment was disbanded in June 1919.

Paul von Lettow-Vorbeck started his career in the 4th Foot Guards.

See also
List of Imperial German infantry regiments

Guards regiments of the Prussian Army